Krásno nad Kysucou is a town in the Čadca District, Žilina Region, north-western Slovakia. Krásno nad Kysucou is the youngest town in Slovakia (it gained the statute of town on the 1. September 2001). It is an industrial town known for its forest industry. It is the third biggest town in Kysuce Region and it is also known to be the gate to the Bystrická dolina. It has 7038 inhabitants.

History
The first written record about Krásno nad Kysucou was in 1325. At first the village was in the possession of  the hereditary reeve of Žilina, then it belonged to the Strečno county.

The First World War together with the Second World War and the Economic Crisis left Krásno, like many other places, in a bad condition. The men, who returned from the front, became extremely angry when they saw that those who had stayed at home during the war, were doing very well. They decided to revenge. The armed plundering was finally stopped by the railmen from Žilina, who were called in by the local Jews. The leader of the plundering died during the first shooting and his companion died on his way to hospital.

Geography
It lies in the Kysuca river valley

Demographics
According to the 2010 census, the town had 6.920 inhabitants with 0.4% Czech as a largest majority. The religious make-up was 91.60% Roman Catholics and 0.13% Lutherans most of others gave no religious affiliation.

Festivals
Gospelové Kysuce (Gospel Kysuce) is an international gospel festival. It takes place every first Friday of September, since 2003. A lot of rock bands that focus on the gospel music are performing here. It starts with the holy mass in the Church of st. Ondrej (which was built in 1861, and it is the biggest church in the Roman Catholic diocese of Žilina).

Sport
16/3 2019 Slovak Bandy Association will organise a new international youth tournament in rink bandy.

Twin towns — sister cities

Krásno nad Kysucou is twinned with:
 Frenštát pod Radhoštěm, Czech Republic
 Metylovice, Czech Republic
 Milówka, Poland

References

External links
 Town website

Villages and municipalities in Čadca District
Cities and towns in Slovakia